Shuibu is a town of Taishan, Guangdong province, China, near Kaiping. , It has one residential community and 20 villages under its administration. Gary Locke, the United States Ambassador to China and the former Governor of the US State of Washington, visited the town in 1997, to visit his ancestral home of Kut Lung or Lilong (吉龍/吉龙).

See also
 Xiqi Village

References

External links

overhead view from live.com

Taishan, Guangdong
Towns in Guangdong